The 1955 Internationale Tulpenrallye was the 7th Internationale Tulpenrallye. It was won for the first time by W.J.J. "Hans" Tak, driving a Mercedes-Benz 300 SL.

Results

References

Rally competitions in the Netherlands
1955 in Dutch motorsport